The 1994 Benson & Hedges Cup was the twenty-third edition of cricket's Benson & Hedges Cup.  It was an English limited overs county cricket tournament which was held between 26 April and 9 July 1994.  The tournament was won, as part of their historic treble of County Championship, Sunday League and Benson & Hedges Cup, by Warwickshire. Warwickshire defeated Worcestershire by 6 wickets in the final at Lord's.

Ireland made their Benson & Hedges Cup debut in this competition, losing in the preliminary round to Leicestershire.

Fixtures and results

Preliminary round

First round

Quarterfinals

Semifinals

Final

References

See also
Benson & Hedges Cup

Benson & Hedges Cup seasons
1994 in English cricket